Bella and the Bulldogs is an American comedy television series created by Jonathan Butler and Gabriel Garza that aired on Nickelodeon from January 17, 2015 to June 25, 2016. The series stars Brec Bassinger, Coy Stewart, Jackie Radinsky, Buddy Handleson, Lilimar, Haley Tju, and Rio Mangini.

Series overview

Episodes

Season 1 (2015)

Season 2 (2015–16)

References 

Lists of American children's television series episodes
Lists of American comedy television series episodes
Lists of Nickelodeon television series episodes